William James Lewis (September 23, 1830 – June 22, 1910) was a physician and political figure in New Brunswick, Canada. He represented Albert County in the Legislative Assembly of New Brunswick from 1879 to 1896 and Albert in the House of Commons of Canada from 1896 to 1904 as an Independent and then Liberal member.

He was born in Hillsborough, New Brunswick, the son of John Lewis, who served in the province's assembly and Legislative Council, and Lavinia Taylor. He was educated there and at Sackville, then went on to study medicine at the University of Glasgow. He served as coroner for Albert County and was also a school trustee. He practised medicine in Hillsborough. He was married twice: to Melissa Steeves in 1877 and to Catherine Duffy in 1885. Lewis was a member of the province's Executive Council from 1882 to 1883. He died in Saint John at the age of 79.

Electoral record

References 
The Canadian parliamentary companion, 1891, JA Gemmill

1830 births
1910 deaths
Canadian Baptists
Liberal Party of Canada MPs
Members of the House of Commons of Canada from New Brunswick
New Brunswick Liberal Association MLAs
People from Albert County, New Brunswick
Canadian coroners
19th-century Baptists